Joan Szymko (born 1957) is an American choral conductor, music educator and composer. She was born in Chicago and studied choral conducting and music education at the University of Illinois at Urbana, graduating in 1978. She settled in Seattle, Washington, and worked as a music teacher, composer and choral conductor.

In 1993 Szymko took a position directing the Aurora Chorus in Portland, Oregon. She founded the women's choir Viriditas Vocal Ensemble in 1994. Szymko composed the music for the Broadway musical Do Jump! and Jan Maher's play Most Dangerous Women.

Works
Szymko composes mainly for theater and choral ensembles. Selected works include:
All Works of Love for the Brock Commission 2010
Nothing But Mud (text: The Church, Zillebeke, October 1918 by William Orpen)
The Call
Carpe Diem
Ein grosser Gesang (text: poems by Rainer Maria Rilke)
Entro en la vida (text: by Teresa of Avilaz)
The Freshness (text: Rumi)
Hear Me! We Are One
Herbst (text: Ranier M Rilke)
How Did the Rose (text: Hafiz)
I Lift My Eyes
I Dream a World (text: poem by Langston Hughes)
Illumina la tenebre (text: St Francis of Assisi)
It Takes a Village (text: West African adage)

Her music has been recorded and issued on CD, including:
Openings (Audio CD, 1998) Virga Records
2010 IMEA Honors Chorus & All-State Chorus (Audio CD - Mar 31, 2010) Mark Records
Texas Music Educators Association 2008: All-State Women's and Men's Choir (Audio CD - Apr 1, 2008) Mark Records
Consecrate: the Place and Day to Music (Audio CD - Oct 2, 2007) Mark Records
Faces of a Woman (Audio CD - Jan 8, 2008) MD&G Records
Cradle of Fire: A Tribute to the Women of World War II (Audio CD - Dec 14, 2004) Indianapolis Women's Label

References

External links
List of works

1957 births
Living people
20th-century classical composers
American women music educators
American women classical composers
American classical composers
Musicians from Chicago
University of Illinois at Urbana–Champaign School of Music alumni
American choral conductors
Women conductors (music)
20th-century American women musicians
20th-century American composers
Educators from Illinois
Classical musicians from Illinois
20th-century American conductors (music)
21st-century American conductors (music)
21st-century American women musicians
20th-century women composers